Caucasian may refer to:

Anthropology
Anything from the Caucasus region
 

 Caucasian Exarchate (1917–1920), an ecclesiastical exarchate of the Russian Orthodox Church in the Caucasus region

Languages

 Northwest Caucasian languages
 Northeast Caucasian languages
 South Caucasian languages
 Dené–Caucasian languages

Other uses
 Certain types of animals:
 Brown Caucasian cattle, a cattle breed
 Caucasian honey bee, a sub-species of the western honey bee
 North Caucasian pig, a pig breed
 Caucasian snowcock, a type of bird
 Caucasian Shepherd Dog, a dog breed
Caucasian (newspaper), newspaper published between 1889 and 1913
 Caucasian, a nickname for a white Russian (cocktail)

See also
Caucasophobia, racism in Russia toward native Caucasus inhabitants
Caucasia (disambiguation)
Caucasian peoples (disambiguation)
Caucasus (disambiguation)
Kavkazsky (disambiguation)

Language and nationality disambiguation pages